Prince of Jingjiang was a princely peerage created and used during the Ming dynasty. It was the tenth princely peerage created by the Hongwu Emperor; his grandnephew Zhu Shouqian was the first to be enfeoffed as Prince of Jingjiang. The Princedom of Jingjiang was distinct from other princely peerages in that the princely title contained two Chinese characters, common to second-rank princedoms but not first-rank princedoms. Nevertheless, the Prince of Jingjiang was still a first-rank princely peerage. The heir apparent to the Princedom of Jingjiang was styled Hereditary Prince, but the titles for other non-inheriting male members of the line was bulwark general or supporter general while female members were styled county lady or village lady, not commandery prince/princess as was common with other first-rank peerages. 

Shitao, a Chinese landscape painter in the early part of the Qing Dynasty, was descended from the Princes of Jingjiang.

Generation poems
The generation poem given by Hongwu Emperor was:

The royal descentants of this peerage not need to follow Wu Xing named rule which needed followed by all of Hongwu Emperor's sons. This poem had used until Heng and Ruo generation during Ming dynasty. The survived descentants had finish used this poem during Jiaqing Emperor's era, and they later created another poem:

Members

Main line

Zhu Shouqian (朱守謙; 1361 – Jan 1392) (1st), the grandnephew of Hongwu Emperor. His grandfather, Zhu Xinglong (朱興隆) was eldest brother of Hongwu Emperor. His father, Zhu Wenzheng (朱文正) involved the established of Ming dynasty. He granted the title of Prince of Jingjiang by Hongwu Emperor, from 1370 to 1380 and took his fief in 1376.. He was demoted by Hongwu Emperor in 1380 and restored the title in 1387. The emperor later demoted him again and house arrested him at Nanjing. He had no posthumous name.
1st son: Zhu Zanyi (1382 – 1408) (2nd), Hongwu Emperor designated him as his father's hereditary prince (heir apparent) after his father died. He succeeded the title of Prince of Jingjiang in 1400. The emperor ordered him to visited other princes and back to the capital. He back to his fief in 1403 and held the title until 1489, due to Jingnan Campaign. Full posthumous name: Prince Daoxi of Jingjiang (靖江悼僖王)
1st son: Zhu Zuojing (1404 – 1469) (3rd), he succeeded the title of Prince of Jingjiang from 1411 – 1469.  Full posthumous name: Prince Zhuangjian of Jingjiang (靖江莊簡王)
1st son: Zhu Xiangcheng (朱相承; died 1458), he died before his father. He was posthumously honoured as Prince of Jingjiang under the full posthumous name Prince Huaishun of Jingjiang (靖江懷順王) in 1471.
1st son: Zhu Guiyu (1453 – 1489) (4th), he succeeded the title of Prince of Jingjiang from 1471 to 1489 after his grandfather died. Full posthumous name: Prince Zhaohe of Jingjiang (靖江昭和王)
1st son: Zhu Yueqi (1475 – 1516) (5th), he succeeded the title of Prince of Jingjiang from 1490 to 1516. Full posthumous name: Prince Duanyi of Jingjiang (靖江端懿王)
1st son: Zhu Jingfu (1493 – 1525) (6th), he succeeded the title of Prince of Jingjiang from 1518 to 1525. Full posthumous name: Prince Ansu of Jingjiang (靖江安肅王)
1st son: Zhu Bangning (1513 – 1572) (7th), he succeeded the title of Prince of Jingjiang from 1527 to 1572. Full posthumous name: Prince Gonghui of Jingjiang (靖江恭惠王)
1st son: Zhu Renchang (1532 – 1582) (8th) he succeeded the title of Prince of Jingjiang from 1575 to 1582. Full posthumous name: Prince Kangxi of Jingjiang (靖江康僖王) 
Zhu Lüdao (1572 – 1590) (9th), he succeeded the title of Prince of Jingjiang from 1585 to 1590. He had not child. Full posthumous name: Prince Wengyu of Jingjiang (靖江溫裕王)
2nd son: Zhu Rensheng (1538 – 1609) (10th), he initially held the title of a bulwark general from 1552 to 1590. He succeeded the title of Prince of Jingjiang from 1592 to 1609. Full posthumous name: Prince Xianding of Jingjiang (靖江憲定王)
1st son: Zhu Lüxiang (朱履祥; 1556 – 1596), initially held the title of a bulwark general. He later designated as his father's hereditary prince but died before his father. 
Zhu Hengyin (1595 – 1650) (13th), he succeeded the title of Prince of Jingjiang from 1646 – 1650. He had resisted the Qing Dynasty, but later collapsed and got killed by Kong Youde in 1650. He had not posthumous name.
Zhu Ruochun, designated as hereditary prince.
2nd son: Zhu Lühu (1568 – 1635) (10th), he succeeded the title of Prince of Jingjiang from 1612 to 1635. Full posthumous name: Prince Rongmu of Jingjiang (靖江荣穆王)
Zhu Hengjia (1583 – 1646) (11th), he succeeded the title of Prince of Jingjiang from 1638 to 1646. He proclaimed himself as regent during Longwu Emperor's reign and killed by him. He had not posthumous name.
Zhu Ruoji / Shitao (1642–1707), designated as hereditary prince.

Lesser members

Zhu Shouqian, 1st prince
Zhu Zanyi, Prince Daoxi (2nd)
Zhu Zuojing, Prince Zhuangjian (3rd)
Zhu Xiangcheng, "Prince Huaishun"
Zhu Guiyu, Prince Zhaohe (4th)
Zhu Yueqi, Prince Duanyi (5th)
Zhu Jingfu, Prince Ansu (6th)
Zhu Bangning, Prince Gonghui (7th)
Zhu Rensheng, Prince Xianding (10th)
2nd, 3rd & 4th daughter: Village Lady Lujiang, Village Lady Jinhe and Village Lady Yongxin
5 unknown sons
2nd, 3rd, 4th, 5th, 6th son: Zhu Yueling, Zhu Yuepao, Zhu Yuezhu, Zhu Yueshe & Zhu Yuechen, both of them held the title of asupporter general.
2nd & 3rd son: Zhu Guiduan & Zhu Guixie, both of them held the title of a supporter general.
2nd to 19th son: Zhu Fayuan, Zhu Xiangji, Zhu Xiangshao, Zhu Xiangchun, Zhu Xianglun, Zhu Xiangying, Zhu Xiangqi, Zhu Xianggong, Zhu Xiangxuan, Zhu Xiangqi, Zhu Xiangcong, Zhu Xiangwei, Zhu Xiangfu, Zhu Xianglian, Zhu Xiangjin, Zhu Xiangshen, Zhu Xiangshou & Zhu Xiangtong, both of them held the title of a supporter general.
2nd son: Zhu Zuomin, held the title of a supporter general. 
2 daughters: County Lady Gongcheng and County Lady Xuanhua
2nd, 3rd, 4th, 5th, 6th, 7th, 8th, & 9th son: Zhu Zanyan, Zhu Zankai, Zhu Zanjun, Zhu Zanxie, Zhu Zanlun, Zhu Zanjie, Zhu Zanchu & Zhu Zanyi, both of them held the title of a bulwark general.

Family tree
Legend:
 – Actual princes

 – Posthumously princes

 – Hereditary prince (Heir apparent)

 – The emperor who created this peerage

Ming dynasty princely peerages
Imperial families of Ming dynasty